Alan S. Becker (February 9, 1946 – July 4, 2020) was an American lawyer, politician, educator, and writer.

Becker was born in Brooklyn, in New York City. He went to Brooklyn College. Becker received his Juris Doctor degree from University of Miami School of Law and was admitted to the Florida bar in 1969. He worked in the office of the Florida Attorney General and as an assistant public defender from 1969 to 1972.

Becker lived in Fort Lauderdale, Florida and taught at the University of Miami School of Law and Keiser University. Becker also wrote a book about rules of evidence and another book about successful people in different areas like politics, the arts, and business. He served in the Florida House of Representatives from November 7, 1972, to November 7, 1978. He was a Democrat. Becker died from cancer at his home in Southwest Ranches, Florida.

Notes

1946 births
2020 deaths
Lawyers from Brooklyn
Politicians from Brooklyn
Politicians from Fort Lauderdale, Florida
People from Southwest Ranches, Florida
Florida lawyers
Writers from Brooklyn
Writers from Fort Lauderdale, Florida
Brooklyn College alumni
University of Miami School of Law alumni
University of Miami faculty
Democratic Party members of the Florida House of Representatives
Deaths from cancer in Florida
20th-century American politicians
21st-century American male writers
20th-century American lawyers
20th-century American male writers
Public defenders